EFMA may stand for:
 Ethernet in the First Mile Alliance, a telecommunications equipment vendor's consortium
 European Forum of Medical Associations, a European liaison to World Health Organization 
 Evangelical Fellowship of Missions Agencies, a professional association of evangelical missions entities (former Evangelical Foreign Missions Association)
 The ICAO airport code for Mariehamn Airport